This is a list of the 3 autonomous islands of the Comoros by Human Development Index as of 2021.

See also

 List of countries by Human Development Index

References

Islands
Ranked lists of country subdivisions